Manusangada  (English title: We are Humans) is a 2017 Indian Tamil-language indie drama film directed by Amshan Kumar. The film is based on a true story about the signaling of the rise of Dalit struggles in contemporary India against long standing human rights violations. The title 'Manusangada' is from Inquilab's poem of the same name and literally means 'We are humans too.'

The film had its world priemere in Jio MAMI Mumbai Film Festival and its International Premiere at the Cairo International Film Festival. It was also selected in the Indian Panorama section of International Film Festival of India, Goa and was the only Tamil film to be selected that year. The film has also won the Best Feature Film award from the Puducherry Government in its 35th Indian Panorama Festival.

Synopsis
When Kolappan's father dies, he isn't allowed to carry his father's body through the common pathway because he's a Dalit. He seeks help from official powers only to find that they are equally casteist. Refusing to be cowed down, Kolappan begins a protest and finds his village standing by him. Based on an actual incident, Kolappan's story is a look at the deeply-embedded prejudice that Dalits have endured and against which they are rising.

Cast
 Rajeev Anand as Kolappan 
 Manimegalai
 A.S.Sasikumar
 Sheela Rajkumar as Revathy 
 Vidhur Rajarajan
 Sethu Darwin
 Anand Sampath

Development and production
Amshan Kumar chanced upon a news clipping of the incident in 2016, he set aside a screenplay of a William Shakespeare adaptation that he had been working on. Manusangada was shot with a handheld camera in a series of shots with the aesthetic that reflects the reality at hand. Kumar wanted  to film it in a docu-drama style with a tragic narrative. The filming was completed in 22 days and was shot on location.

Awards and film festivals
Best Feature Film Award, Government of Puducherry, Indian Panorama 

The film was screened at the following Film festivals:
19th Jio Mami Film Festival
Cairo International Film Festival
Indian Panorama section of International Film Festival of India
Chennai International Film Festival
ICFT UNESCO Gandhi Medal
Pune International Film Festival
Thrissur International Film Festival
13th Habitat Film Festival
Solapur International film festival
Orange City Film Festival
ChintaBar 2K18 Film Festival

References

External links
 

2017 films
Indian drama films
Films about the caste system in India